The Prince Albert I Medal was established by Prince Rainier of Monaco in partnership with the International Association for the Physical Sciences of the Oceans. The medal was named for Prince Albert I and is given for significant work in the physical and chemical sciences of the oceans. The medal is awarded biannually by IAPSO at its Assemblies.

Past recipients
 2001: Walter Munk
 2003: Klaus Wyrtki
 2005: Friedrich Schott
 2007: Russ Davis
 2009: Harry Bryden
 2011: Trevor McDougall
 2013: Arnold L. Gordon
 2015: Toshio Yamagata
 2017: Lynne Talley
 2019: Corinne Le Quéré
 2021: Carl Wunsch

References

External links
 Prince Albert I Medal

Science and technology awards